Roberta MacGlashan was a Sacramento County Supervisor in Sacramento County, California, US.

MacGlashan is a Republican who was elected to the non-partisan Board in November 2004. She served on the Citrus Heights City Council from 1997 until 2005, serving as mayor twice and as vice-mayor three times. She lives in Gold River with her husband. She was a representative on the Sacramento Board of Supervisors, District 4.  She decided not to seek re-election in 2016 and her replacement took office in Jan. 2017.

References

Year of birth missing (living people)
Living people
Sacramento County Supervisors
California Republicans
California city council members
Women city councillors in California
Mayors of places in California
Women mayors of places in California
People from Citrus Heights, California
People from Sacramento County, California
21st-century American women